Clement Shahbaz Bhatti (9 September 19682 March 2011), popularly known as Shahbaz Bhatti, was a Pakistani politician who was elected as a member of the National Assembly from 2008. He was the first Federal Minister for Minorities Affairs from November 2008 until his assassination on 2 March 2011 in Islamabad and the only Christian in the Cabinet.  More than 70 bullets were fired at his car.   A militant group, Tehrik-i-Taliban Pakistan, claimed responsibility for his killing and called him a blasphemer of Muhammad. In March 2016, five years after the death of Shahbaz Bhatti, his cause for beatification was formally opened by the Roman Catholic Diocese of Islamabad-Rawalpindi.  He was given the honorary title Servant of God within the Roman Catholic Church.

Early life 
Bhatti was born in Lahore to Christian parents from the Faisalabad District. His father, Jacob Bhatti, worked as an officer of the British Army, then as a teacher, before becoming chairman of the board of churches in Khushpur.

Bhatti married his wife, Salma, in December 1995. Salma made a detailed video of their relationship on March 2, 2014.<https://www.youtube.com/watch?v=6URmel-HEzs&ab_channel=PakistaniChristian>. In the video, she notes their secret relationship, which was not accepted by their family members. <https://www.youtube.com/watch?v=6URmel-HEzs&ab_channel=PakistaniChristian>

Career 
As a student, Bhatti founded and served as head of Pakistan's Christian Liberation Front, which he formed in 1985. He founded the All Pakistan Minorities Alliance (APMA) in 2002 and was unanimously elected as its chairman. He met with President Pervez Musharraf as part of a group of minority rights advocates. Bhatti joined the Pakistan Peoples Party (PPP) in 2002, but remained outside politics until becoming a minister in 2008. He was placed on the government's Exit Control List in 2003, but was removed in November of that year.

Bhatti was appointed as Federal Minister for Minorities Affairs on 2 November 2008, when, for the first time, the post was elevated to cabinet level and an independent ministry created. At the time, he said that he accepted the post for the sake of the "oppressed, down-trodden and marginalized" of Pakistan, and that he had dedicated his life to the "struggle for human equality, social justice, religious freedom, and to uplift and empower religious minorities' communities." He added that he wanted to send "a message of hope to the people living a life of disappointment, disillusionment and despair", and also stated his commitment to reforming the country's blasphemy laws.

During his time as federal minister, he took numerous steps in support of religious minorities. These included the launch of a national campaign to promote interfaith harmony, the proposal of legislation to ban hate speech and related literature, the proposed introduction of comparative religion as a curriculum subject, the introduction of quotas for religious minorities in government posts, and the reservation of four Senate seats for minorities. Bhatti also spearheaded the organisation of a National Interfaith Consultation in July 2010, which brought together senior religious leaders of all faiths from across Pakistan and resulted in a joint declaration against terrorism.

Assassination 
Bhatti had been the recipient of death threats since 2009, when he spoke in support of Pakistani Christians attacked in the 2009 Gojra riots in Punjab Province. These threats increased following his support for Asia Bibi, a Pakistani Christian sentenced to death in 2010 for blasphemy. The United States had tried to obtain increased security for him and get him an armoured car but was unsuccessful. Bhatti himself foretold his death and recorded a video, which was to be released in case of his death, where he said "I believe in Jesus Christ who has given his own life for us, and I am ready to die for a cause. I'm living for my community ... and I will die to defend their rights."

According to the BBC, Bhatti was travelling to work through a residential district, having just left his mother's home, when his vehicle was sprayed with bullets. At the time of the attack he was alone, without any security. His driver reports having stopped the car and ducked when he saw armed men approaching rather than attempting to evade the threat. Bhatti was taken to a nearby hospital, but he was pronounced dead on arrival. The group Tehrik-i-Taliban told the BBC that they carried out the attack, because Bhatti was a "known blasphemer." A Roman Catholic who had criticised Pakistan's blasphemy law, his death follows that of Punjab governor Salman Taseer, who was also assassinated amid the controversy over the blasphemy law.

On the day following Bhatti's assassination, hundreds of Christian demonstrators reportedly took to the streets across Punjab, with protesters burning tires and demanding justice. According to Minorities Concern of Pakistan, "Investigators are divided over the assassination case with some in the Islamabad police pointing the fingers at the Taliban and al-Qaeda". Later in 2011, an attempt was also made to shift the blame to "internal squabbles" among Christians. According to the same group, the identity of Bhatti's murderer was still unknown. In the months that followed, minority groups in Pakistan demanded the formation of a commission to probe the Bhatti case.

Reactions 
Domestic
Farahnaz Ispahani, an aide to President Asif Ali Zardari, condemned the assassination, saying: "This is a concerted campaign to slaughter every liberal, progressive and humanist voice in Pakistan." President Zardari vowed to combat the forces of obscurantism, and said, "we will not be intimidated nor will we retreat." The government declared three days of mourning. However, when the prime minister, Yousaf Raza Gillani, led a two-minute silence in parliament, three members of the Jamiat Ulema-i-Islam party remained seated. Muhammad Rafi Usmani, the grand mufti of Pakistan, referred to the possibility of the assassination being "an American conspiracy to defame the government of Pakistan, Muslims and Islam." The Pakistani delegate to the United Nations Human Rights Council, Asim Ahmad, said that it would not be right to link Bhatti's murder to the issue of blasphemy. Ahmad said freedom of speech could not justify defamation and blasphemy; "It is important to prevent the deliberate campaign of defamation of Islam and its Prophet."

Foreign
 The European Union condemned the murder, and expressed their concern about the climate of intolerance on the controversial blasphemy laws, and the United Nations High Commissioner for Human Rights called on Pakistan to reform its blasphemy laws.

Leaders of Australia, Canada, France, Germany, India, Spain, UK, USA, and the Vatican expressed their shock and condemnation of his killing.

Church
On the first anniversary of his death Pakistani Catholic priests called for the Pakistani Catholic bishops to open the cause of canonisation for Bhatti. Afterwards Pakistani bishops sent a formal request to the Pope to officially name Bhatti a martyr. Bhatti's canonisation is also supported by Cardinal Keith O'Brien, who has said that he could be patron of "Justice and Peace in Pakistan or even Asia". The Bible owned by Shahbaz Bhatti was placed in San Bartolomeo all'Isola as a relic of a 21st-century martyr, part of the memorial to 20th- and 21st-century martyrs.

See also
Blasphemy law

References

External links 
 Shahbaz Bhatti Memorial Trust, Official Website of Shahbaz Bhatti, Founded by his brother Dr.Paul Bhatti.
 All Pakistan Minorities Alliance , Official Website of Shahbaz Bhatti's APMA.
 Shahbaz Bhatti , Pakistan Herald profile.
 Shahbaz Bhatti receives International Religious Freedom Award. Pakistan Press International Article, 21 March 2004.
 PAKISTAN: Religious freedom in the shadow of extremism. CSW religious freedom briefing, June 2011.
 Unofficial site in support of his cause

1968 births
2011 deaths
21st-century Roman Catholic martyrs
Assassinated Pakistani politicians
Deaths by firearm in Islamabad
Federal ministers of Pakistan
Hate crimes
2011 murders in Pakistan
Pakistan People's Party politicians
Pakistani Servants of God
People from Khushpur
Persecution of Christians in Pakistan
Punjabi people
People convicted of blasphemy in Pakistan
21st-century venerated Christians
Victims of the Tehrik-i-Taliban Pakistan